Bamra albicola is a moth of the family Noctuidae first described by Francis Walker in 1858.

Distribution
This species is found in Sri Lanka, India, Thailand, Vietnam, Peninsular Malaysia, Sumatra, Borneo, China, Taiwan, Japan and Sulawesi.

Description
The species shows sexual dimorphism. In the female, the forewings are irregularly fasciated pale grey in color which is almost white in the male, with a distinctive darker zone on the costa. Hindwings are also darker in the female than in male.

Subspecies
Two subspecies are recognized.
Bamra albicola albicola
Bamra albicola melli Draudt, 1950 - Taiwan

References

Moths of Asia
Moths described in 1858